The  Cherry Creek News is a Denver, Colorado community newspaper reaching 15,000 readers in the neighborhoods of Crestmoor, Cherry Creek North, Lowry, Hilltop, Polo Grounds, Bonnie Brae, and Virginia Village.

External links
 Home page

Newspapers published in Colorado
Mass media in Denver